
Year 113 BC was a year of the pre-Julian Roman calendar. At the time it was known as the Year of the Consulship of Caprarius and Carbo (or, less frequently, year 641 Ab urbe condita) and the Fourth Year of Yuanding. The denomination 113 BC for this year has been used since the early medieval period, when the Anno Domini calendar era became the prevalent method in Europe for naming years.

Events
By place
Roman Republic
 The Cimbri and Teutones cross the Danube and enter the lands of the Celtic tribe, the Taurisci. The latter appeal to Rome for assistance and the Senate sends an army under Gnaeus Papirius Carbo to drive the Germans back. The Romans attack the retreating columns as they pass the town of Noreia, but the Roman army is ultimately defeated.
 Germanic tribes attack Gaul and northern Iberia.
Celtiberians lead a war against the Romans.

Syria
 Antiochus IX Cyzicenus becomes king of the Seleucid Empire.

Numidia
 Cirta is besieged by Jugurtha.

China
 The state of Nanyue, a vassal of the Han Dynasty, agrees to submit to Han laws and receives envoys to oversee the succession of the young king Zhao Xing.

By topic
Art
 An incense burner, later found in the tomb of Liu Sheng, Prince of Zhongshan in Mancheng, Hebei, is made during the Han Dynasty. It is now kept at Hebei Provincial Museum, Shijiazhuang.

Deaths
 Decimus Junius Brutus Callaicus, Roman consul and general (b. 180 BC)
 Liu Sheng, Chinese prince of the Han Dynasty
 Zhang Qian, Chinese explorer, official and diplomat (b. 164 BC)
References